Esra-Leon Limbacher (born 1 May 1989in Wiesbaden) is a German politician of the Social Democratic Party (SPD) who has been serving as a member of the Bundestag since 2021. He has been the SME representative and deputy economic policy spokesperson of the SPD parliamentary group since 2022. Previously, he was a member of the Saarland state parliament Landtag of Saarland until November 2021.

Early life and education
Limbacher was born in the West German city of Wiesbaden and grew up in Limbach in the municipality of Kirkel. After graduation from high school in the Saarpfalz district he studied law at Saarland University in order to become a lawyer. He studied law both in Germany and England as a scholarship holder of the Friedrich Ebert Foundation. At the University of Exeter, he obtained a Master of Laws with a focus on international commercial law. He completed his law studies in Germany, again at Saarland University, specialising in German and international tax law. He passed his second state law examination in the Higher Regional Court District of Zweibrücken, Rhineland-Palatinate. Professionally, Limbacher passed through stations in various law firms before becoming an officer in the higher service of the Saarland state administration. Here he was deployed as a lawyer within the taskforce for cross-border commuters. Since 2020, Limbacher has been pursuing a doctorate and is a lecturer at Saarland University.

Political career
Limbacher entered the SPD in 2005. Here he held various political offices in the youth organization Jussos and the SPD. In the Jusos, Limbacher was involved as district chairman of Saarpfalz and deputy state chairman in Saarland. In 2009, he was elected to the local council of the municipality of Kirkel in the local elections and was elected directly to the Bundestag in the 2021 elections, representing the Homburg district. In parliament, he has been serving on the Committee on Legal Affairs and the Committee on Economic Affairs. Since 2019, he has also been a member of the Saarpfalz district council and parliamentary group leader of the SPD.

Since 2021, Esra Limbacher has been the district chairman of the SPD Saarpfalz, together with Christine Streichert-Clivot.

In the 2017 federal election, he stood as a candidate for the direct mandate in the constituency of Homburg. With 31.4% of the first votes, he lost to the CDU politician Markus Uhl, who received 33.6% of the votes. In June 2021, he succeeded Stefan Pauluhn in the Saarland Landtag. In the 2017 Saarland state election in Saarland, Limbacher had initially missed out on entry due to his list placement.

Limbacher was also nominated by the SPD as a candidate for the 2021 federal election. This time he received the most votes with 36.6%, followed by Markus Uhl, who received 26.1% of the votes. This meant that he entered the 20th German Bundestag as a directly elected MP. In the course of this, he resigned his Landtag mandate. Susanne Kasztantowicz succeeded him in the Landtag. In the 20th German Bundestag, Limbacher is a member of both the Economic Committee and the Legal Committee. Since 2022, he has been the SME representative of the SPD parliamentary group in the Bundestag. In November 2022, he was elected as deputy economic policy spokesman of the SPD parliamentary group in the Bundestag after his predecessor Falko Mohrs became Minister of Science in Lower Saxony.

Within his parliamentary group, Limbacher has been part of the Seeheim Circle.

Other activities
 St. John Accident Assistance (JHU), Member

External links

 Wbsite of Esra-Leon Limbacher
 Biography at German Bundestag
 Short vita on the website of the Saarpfalz district council

References 

Members of the Bundestag for Saarland
Members of the Landtag of Saarland
German jurists
Living people
1989 births
Politicians from Wiesbaden
Social Democratic Party of Germany politicians
Members of the Bundestag 2021–2025
21st-century German politicians